In applied mathematics, fbsp wavelets are frequency B-spline wavelets.

fbsp m-fb-fc

These frequency B-spline wavelets are complex wavelets whose spectrum are spline.

 

where sinc function that appears in Shannon sampling theorem.

 m > 1 is the order of the spline
 fb is a bandwidth parameter
 fc is the wavelet center frequency

Clearly, Shannon wavelet (sinc wavelet) is a particular case of fbsp.

References 

 S.G. Mallat, A Wavelet Tour of Signal Processing, Academic Press, 1999, 
 C.S. Burrus, R.A. Gopinath, H. Guo, Introduction to Wavelets and Wavelet Transforms: A Primer, Prentice-Hall, 1988,  .
 O. Cho, M-J. Lai, A Class of Compactly Supported Orthonormal B-Spline Wavelets in: Splines and Wavelets, Athens 2005, G Chen and M-J Lai Editors pp. 123–151.
 M. Unser, Ten Good Reasons for Using Spline Wavelets, Proc. SPIE, Vol.3169, Wavelets Applications in Signal and Image Processing, 1997, pp. 422–431.

Continuous wavelets